Gambrostola is a genus of moths in the family Gelechiidae. It contains the species Gambrostola imposita, which is found in South Africa.

References

Endemic moths of South Africa
Gelechiinae